The San Andreas League is a high school athletic league that is part of the CIF Southern Section.  Members are located around  San Bernardino County, California. The San Andreas League Is now a part of a conference that also includes The Sunkist League, Notre Dame High School and Wilmer Amina Carter High School the conference has 3 leagues, San Andreas League, Sunkist League, and Skyline League. All schools for boys and girls sports can move freely through the 3 leagues through means of competitive balance. This conference is called the Arrowhead Athletic Conference

Members
 Arroyo Valley High School
 Eisenhower High School
 Jurupa Hills High School
 Rim of the World High School
 Rialto High School
 San Gorgonio High School

References

CIF Southern Section leagues